Richard Russell Southam (January 26, 1907 – August 26, 1994) was a Member of Parliament (MP) in the House of Commons of Canada.  He represented the riding of Moose Mountain and later the newly created  riding of Qu'Appelle—Moose Mountain, Saskatchewan. In June 1957, Southam lost to Edward George McCullough in the Moose Mountain riding. On March 31, 1958, he won the seat and retained it through the June 18, 1962, April 8, 1963, and November 8, 1965  general elections.

See also
 28th Canadian Parliament
 Qu'Appelle—Moose Mountain

References

External links
 

1907 births
1994 deaths
Progressive Conservative Party of Canada MPs
Members of the House of Commons of Canada from Saskatchewan